César Fabián Delgado Godoy (born 18 August 1981) is an Argentine former professional footballer who played as a winger. He also played as a central midfielder, making piercing forward runs through the center of the opposition's defence. His nickname "Chelito" is derived from that of Marcelo Delgado (known as "El Chelo") because of their same last name. Since 2013, he also holds Mexican citizenship.

Club career
Born in Rosario, Argentina, Delgado started his career at Rosario Central. He joined Cruz Azul for the 2003 Apertura, where he finished with 16 appearances and eight goals. Delgado made 21 appearances in the subsequent Apertura, again scoring eight goals. In the 2004 Apertura, Delgado scored another six goals in 15 games.

On 8 January 2008, Delgado moved to French club Lyon who paid a transfer fee of €11 million. He made his Ligue 1 debut on 20 January 2008 against RC Lens. Delgado came on as an 85th-minute substitute Lisandro López on 21 October 2009 against Liverpool in the UEFA Champions League and scored the winning goal in a 2–1 victory. It was Lyon's first win in the UEFA Champions League against English opposition.

On 10 June 2011, Delgado signed with C.F. Monterrey, and participated in the 2011 Mexican League Apertura, CONCACAF Champions League and Club World Cup tournaments.

International career
Delgado played for Argentina in the 2004 Copa América, scoring one goal, and was part of their gold medal-winning team at the 2004 Summer Olympics.

He played several matches for the Argentina national football team during 2006 FIFA World Cup qualification, but due to injury he did not make the 23-man squad for the tournament.

Career statistics

Club

International

International goals
Scores and results list Argentina's goal tally first, score column indicates score after each Delgado goal.

Honours

Club
Cruz Azul
 Copa Panamericana 2007Lyon Ligue 1: 2007–08
 Coupe de France: 2007–08Monterrey CONCACAF Champions League: 2011–12, 2012–13

InternationalArgentina'''
 Olympic Games: 2004

Individual
FIFA Club World Cup top scorer: 2012, 2013

References

External links
 
 

Argentine footballers
1981 births
Living people
Olympic footballers of Argentina
Olympic gold medalists for Argentina
Argentina international footballers
Association football forwards
Footballers at the 2004 Summer Olympics
2004 Copa América players
2005 FIFA Confederations Cup players
Rosario Central footballers
Cruz Azul footballers
C.F. Monterrey players
Footballers from Rosario, Santa Fe
Olympique Lyonnais players
Ligue 1 players
Argentine expatriate footballers
Argentine Primera División players
Liga MX players
Argentine emigrants to Mexico
Naturalized citizens of Mexico
Mexican footballers
Expatriate footballers in France
Argentine expatriate sportspeople in France
Olympic medalists in football
Medalists at the 2004 Summer Olympics